Taurodeoxycholic acid is a bile acid.  This compound is a closely related isomer of Taurochenodeoxycholic acid and Tauroursodeoxycholic acid sharing the exact molecular formula and molecular weight. 

Mass Spectrometry Interference with PFOS

Benskin and colleagues (https://pubs.acs.org/doi/pdf/10.1021/ac070802d) published in 2007 an article identifying Taurodeoxycholic acid and isomers as mass spectrometry interferents with PFOS (Perfluorooctanesulfonic acid) as the two compounds share the m/z transition of 498-80.  The molecular weight of PFOS and taurodeoxycholic acid and isomers are similar enough in molecular weight that most low resolution Triple quadrupole mass spectrometer are unable to distinguish these two chemicals from each other.  Additionally both compounds share a Sulfonate group (leading to the m/z 80 loss) in the common mass spectrometry transition.  Reiner and colleagues https://pubs.acs.org/doi/pdf/10.1021/es800770f found these bile acid compounds in chicken eggs and suggest that monitoring for m/z 99 (FSO3 loss) as does Benskin and colleagues noted above.

Compounding the issue is PFOS is widely distributed in global wildlife, and analysis of blood, liver and flesh of monitored wildlife will likely also contain these bile acids.  Therefore caution must be taken in sample cleanup, analysis and mass spectra interpretations.  Strynar and colleagues  ASMS Strynar et al., 2009   demonstrated the presence of these cholic acids in a number of biological samples.  Additionally they gave suggestions for removal of this interferent issue during PFOS analysis including the use of high resolution mass spectrometry (Time-of-flight mass spectrometry) that is able to resolve PFOS (monoisotopic mass 498.9302)  from cholic acids (monoisotopic mass 498.2895) easily.  Additional suggestions included removal of cholic acids through the Solid-phase extraction cleanup of methanolic extracts using Supelco's ENVI-Carb cartridge or monitoring for the presence of cholic acids via m/z 498-124 and 498-107 which PFOS does not respond to.

References

Bile acids
Sulfonic acids
Cholanes